Ashkaran Sankhwar is an Indian politician.  He was elected to the Lok Sabha, the lower house of the Parliament of India from the Ghatampur constituency of Uttar Pradesh as a member of the Indian National Congress.

References

External links
 Official Biographical Sketch in Lok Sabha Website

1945 births
Indian National Congress politicians from Uttar Pradesh
Living people
Janata Party (Secular) politicians
Janata Party politicians
Samajwadi Party politicians
India MPs 1980–1984
India MPs 1984–1989